Omethoate (C5H12NO4PS) is a systemic organophosphorous insecticide and acaricide available as a soluble concentrate. It is used to control insects and mites in horticulture and agriculture, as well as in the home garden.

Omethoate works by inhibiting the enzyme 
acetylcholinesterase. This inhibition over-stimulattes parts of the nervous system that 
rely on acetylcholine to transmit nerve impulses. 

It is an irritant to the skin and mucous membranes.
Its toxicity and hazard potential are still under review because of concerns about its safety. Additionally, it cannot be used on food products.

The acceptable daily intake (ADI) has been amended from 0.0003 to 0.0004 mg/kg bw

Other names
 Folimat - Registered trademark.

Footnotes

External links
 Omethoate review - updated 22 August 2008.
 

Acetylcholinesterase inhibitors
Organophosphate insecticides
Acetamides
Organothiophosphate esters